

Events
 1445 - Printing press developed in Europe.

Works
 Per Raff Lille, Mariaviser ("Songs to Mary"), Denmark
  ("The Great Rhymed Chronicle"), Sweden
 1402–1403 – Christine de Pisan, Le Livre du chemin de long estude, describing a trial of the faults of this world in the "Court of Reason"
 1403 – Christine de Pisan, La Mutacion de Fortune ("The Changes of Fortune")
 c.1434 – John Lydgate, The Life of St. Edmund, King and Martyr
 c.1470–1485 – Pietru Caxaro, Il Cantilena, oldest known Maltese text
 c.1480s – Robert Henryson, cycle The Morall Fabillis of Esope the Phrygian in Scotland
 1473–1480 – Maladhar Basu, ''Sri Krishna Vijaya (শ্রীকৃষ্ণবিজয়, "Triumph of Lord Krishna"), Bengal

Births and deaths

Mexico
Axayacatl (1449-1481), huey tlatoani (supreme leader or emperor) of Tenochtitlan and poet
Ayocuan Cuetzpaltzin (mid 15th-early 16th centuries) wise man, poet, white eagle from Tecamachalco
Cacamatzin (1483-1520), tlatoani of Texcoco and poet
Chichicuepon (15th century) poet from Chalco (altépetl)
Cuacuauhtzin (1410-1443), tlatoani (ruler) of Tepechpan wrote a poem about his betrayal by Nezahualcoyotl.
Macuilxochitzin (c. 1435-?), daughter of Tlacaelel
Nezahualcoyotl (tlatoani) (1402-1472), ruler of Texcoco (altepetl), poet, and architect
Tecayehuatzin of Huexotzinco (second half of 15th to early 16th century), poet and philosopher (Huexotzinco was a semi-independent state, alternately  loyal to the Aztec Empire or to Tlaxcala.)
Temilotzin (end of 15th century-1525), born in Tlatelolco (altepetl) and Tlatoani of Tzilacatlan
Tochihuitzin coyolchiuhqui, (late 14th-mid 15th centuries) Tlatoani and poet from Teotlatzinco, son of Itzcoatl
Xicotencatl I (1425-1522) tlatoani of Tizatlan (Tlaxcala)

Europe
 Per Raff Lille (c. 1450 — c. 1500), Danish
 Tomas af Strangnas, (died 1443), Swedish
 François Villon (1431–1463), French
 Janus Pannonius (1431–1472), Latin from Hungary

Japan
 Arakida Moritake 荒木田守武 (1473–1549), the son of Negi Morihide, and a Shinto priest; said to have excelled in waka, renga, and in particular haikai
Ikkyū 休宗純, Ikkyū Sōjun 1394–1481), eccentric, iconic, Rinzai Zen Buddhist priest, poet and sometime mendicant flute player who influenced Japanese art and literature with an infusion of Zen attitudes and ideals; one of the creators of the formal Japanese tea ceremony; well-known to Japanese children through various stories and the subject of a popular Japanese children's television program; made a character in anime fiction
 Shōtetsu 正徹 (1381–1459), considered by some the last great poet in the courtly waka tradition; his disciples were important in the development of renga, which led to haiku
 Sōgi 宗祇 (1421–1502), Japanese Zen monk who studied waka and renga poetry, then became a professional renga poet in his 30s
Yamazaki Sōkan 山崎宗鑑, pen name of Shina Norishige (1465–1553), renga and haikai poet, court calligrapher for Shōgun Ashikaga Yoshihisa; became a secluded Buddhist monk following the shōgun's death in 1489

Persian language
 Jami, poet (1414–1492)
 Mir Ali Shir Nava'i, poet (1441–1501)

South Asia
 Bhalan (c. 1426–1500), Indian, Gujarati-language poet
 Chandidas (চন্ডীদাস) (born 1408 CE) refers to (possibly more than one) medieval Indian Bengali-language poet
 Meerabai (मीराबाई) (1498-1547), alternate spelling: Meera, Mira, Meera Bai; Hindu poet-saint, mystical poet whose compositions, extant version of which are in Gujarati and a Rajasthani dialect of Hindi, remain popular throughout India
 Nund Reshi (1377–1440), Indian, Kashmiri-language poet
 Zainuddin (fl. 1470s), Bengali-language poet

See also
 15th century in literature
 Macronic poetry

Decades and years

Notes

 01
Poetry by century